Kar Chang is a village in Kuhsaran Rural District, in the Central District of Qaem Shahr County, Mazandaran Province, Iran. At the 2006 census, its population was 185, in 63 families.

References 

Populated places in Qaem Shahr County